The Saudi Premier League 1975–76 is the first league to be named Saudi Premier League. The Saudi League and all sports season championships in the 1975–1976 season were canceled for the death of King Faisal that year.

Stadia and locations

League table

References

External links 
Saudi Arabia 1975/76
Saudi Arabia Football Federation
Saudi League Statistics

Saudi Premier League seasons
Saudi
1975–76 in Saudi Arabian football